A state bird is the insignia of a nation or a state (sub-national entity).  

For lists of these animals, see:
 List of national birds, national birds on country level
 List of Australian bird emblems, for the Australian states
 List of Brazilian state birds, for the Brazilian states
 List of Indian state birds, for the Indian states
 List of U.S. state birds, for the U.S. states

"State bird" may also refer to:
 State Bird Provisions, a restaurant in San Francisco, California.

See also 
 List of national animals, for a list of other animals per country
 List of animals representing first-level administrative country subdivisions, for a list of animals on the sub-country level

Symbols of country subdivisions